The 2009–10 HockeyAllsvenskan season was the fifth season of HockeyAllsvenskan, the second level of ice hockey in Sweden. 14 teams participated in the league, and the top four qualified for the Kvalserien, with the opportunity to be promoted to the Elitserien.

Participating teams

Regular season

Playoffs
Teams ranked 4th through 7th met in a best-of-three elimination playoff, the winner of which continued to the Elitserien qualifiers.  Starting with the following season, this playoff round was replaced by a double-round robin group stage.

In the first round, Almtuna and Malmö each beat their opponents (Mora and Bofors), both 2–0 in games.  Almtuna then beat Malmö 2–1 in games in the second round, to continue to the Elitserien qualifier.

Bracket

First round

Second round

Elitserien qualifiers

HockeyAllsvenskan qualifiers

External links

 Season on hockeyarchives.info

Swe
2009–10 in Swedish ice hockey leagues
HockeyAllsvenskan seasons